"Lonely Symphony (We Will be Free)" was the  entry at the Eurovision Song Contest 1994 in Dublin, Ireland. The song was written by George De Angelis and Mark Dean and sung by Frances Ruffelle in English.

At Eurovision
Performing sixth on the night, following 's Sigga singing "Nætur" and preceding 's Tony Cetinski singing "Nek' ti bude ljubav sva", it received 63 points and placed 10th in a field of twenty-five.

It was succeeded as the UK representative by Love City Groove with "Love City Groove".

Critical reception
Mark Frith from Smash Hits gave the song three out of five, writing, "Everyone makes jokes about the Eurovision Song Contest, but we all want to win really. Frances Ruffelle is a rather wonderful, gutsy singer who could sing the London phone directory and make it sound good. And guess what? She just has! Well almost. This pleasant, atmospheric gospel song is the last thing that wins Eurovision. But after repeated listens it's wonderful."

Track listing

Charts
It was released on 4 April 1994, and peaked at number 25 in the UK Singles Chart.

References

External links
 Lyrics from Diggiloo Thrush

British songs
Eurovision songs of 1994
Eurovision songs of the United Kingdom
1994 singles
1994 songs
Number-one singles in Israel
Virgin Records singles